Skarszyn  is a village in the administrative district of Gmina Trzebnica, within Trzebnica County, Lower Silesian Voivodeship, in southwestern Poland. Prior to 1945 it was part of Germany.

References

Skarszyn